Nicholas Anthony Ciuffo (born March 7, 1995) is an American professional baseball catcher in the New York Yankees organization. He has played in Major League Baseball (MLB) for the Tampa Bay Rays and Baltimore Orioles. Ciuffo attended Lexington High School in Lexington, South Carolina, and was selected by the Rays in the first round of the 2013 MLB draft.

Amateur career
Ciuffo attended Wando High School in Mount Pleasant, South Carolina, for his freshman and sophomore years, and then transferred to Lexington High School in Lexington, South Carolina. As a freshman, Ciuffo was named to the All-Lowcountry team. Lexington won the state's Class 4A championship in 2013, and Ciuffo was named the South Carolina Gatorade Player of the Year. In 123 cumulative high school games, Ciuffo had a .401 batting average, 11 home runs, and 93 runs batted in (RBIs). He competed for the United States national baseball team, leading the United States to the gold medal in the 2011 World Youth Baseball Championship.

Ciuffo had been committed to attend the University of South Carolina to play college baseball for the South Carolina Gamecocks. He received the scholarship offer before playing a single high school game. However, he was also considered a likely first round pick in the 2013 Major League Baseball Draft, and said that the chances of his signing a contract and forgoing his college commitment are "50-50".

Professional career

Tampa Bay Rays
The Tampa Bay Rays selected Ciuffo in the first round, with the 21st overall selection, of the 2013 Major League Baseball draft. Ciuffo signed with the Rays, receiving a $1,974,700 signing bonus, and reported to the Gulf Coast Rays to begin his professional career. He appeared in 43 games for the GCL Rays where he slashed .258/.296/.308.

Ciuffo began the 2014 season in extended spring training, was assigned to the Princeton Rays in June, where he spent the entire season, batting .224 with four home runs and 20 RBIs in 52 games. He played with the Bowling Green Hot Rods in 2015 and batted .258 with one home run and 32 RBIs in 94 games. In 2016, with the Charlotte Stone Crabs, Ciuffo compiled a .262 batting average with 15 RBIs and 8 doubles in 59 games. After the 2016 season, Ciuffo was named Tampa Bay's Minor League Defensive Player of the Year. He spent 2017 with the Montgomery Biscuits and posted a .245 batting average with seven home runs and 42 RBIs in 102 games. He was named Tampa Bay's Minor League Defensive Player of the Year for the second straight season. The Rays invited Ciuffo to spring training in 2018, but he was suspended for 50 games for his second positive test for a drug of abuse. In the 2018 season, Ciuffo played for the Durham Bulls of the Class AAA International League. Ciuffo hit .262/.301/.380 with five home runs and 28 runs batted in over 60 games.

Major Leagues
On September 3, 2018, Ciuffo was promoted to the major leagues. Ciuffo slashed .189/.262/.297 with one home run in 37 at-bats.

On June 28, 2019, the Rays designated Ciuffo for assignment. On July 1, Ciuffo was placed on release waivers.

Cincinnati Reds 
On July 9, 2019, Ciuffo signed a minor league contract with the Cincinnati Reds. He became a free agent following the 2019 season.

Texas Rangers
On December 5, 2019, Ciuffo signed a minor league contract with the Texas Rangers. The Rangers included Ciuffo in their 60-man player pool for the 2020 season. Ciuffo did not play in a game in 2020 due to the cancellation of the minor league season because of the COVID-19 pandemic. He became a free agent on November 2, 2020.

Baltimore Orioles
On December 21, 2020, Ciuffo signed a minor league contract with the Baltimore Orioles organization. The Orioles promoted him to the major leagues on September 24, 2021. Ciuffo went 1-for-5 with a double in two games for Baltimore, spending the majority of the year with the Triple-A Norfolk Tides, with whom he slashed .173/.241/.308. On November 5, 2021, Ciuffo was outrighted off of the 40-man roster. He became a free agent on November 7.

Chicago White Sox
On March 14, 2022, Ciuffo signed a minor league deal with the Chicago White Sox. Ciuffo played in 42 games for the Triple-A Charlotte Knights, hitting .277/.325/.411 with 5 home runs and 20 RBI. He elected free agency following the season on November 10.

New York Yankees
On March 7, 2023, Ciuffo signed a minor league contract with the New York Yankees organization.

Personal life
Ciuffo grew up in Mount Pleasant, but moved to Lexington between his sophomore and junior years with his mother. His father, Tony, worked at the College of Charleston as its assistant director of athletics for media relations and the school's radio PBP announcer, which enabled Nick to observe the Charleston baseball team, and future major leaguers Brett Gardner and Michael Kohn.

References

External links

1995 births
Living people
People from Mount Pleasant, South Carolina
Baseball players from South Carolina
Major League Baseball catchers
Tampa Bay Rays players
Baltimore Orioles players
Gulf Coast Rays players
Princeton Rays players
Bowling Green Hot Rods players
Charlotte Stone Crabs players
Brisbane Bandits players
Peoria Javelinas players
Montgomery Biscuits players
Durham Bulls players
Arizona League Reds players
Louisville Bats players
Norfolk Tides players
American expatriate baseball players in Australia